Basugaon (IPA:ˈbɑːsʊˌgɑ̃ʊ) is a Town in Chirang District of Assam, India. The name of this town is derived from its high bamboo plantation and bamboo market basically "basu" or "bash" means bamboo and "gaon" means village that is Basugaon, 'The village of bamboo'. It is an industrial town and a Municipal Board area. It is a neighbourhood of Bongaigaon UA, and it is situated approximately 180 km from Guwahati City in the western part of the Lower Assam Region.

Popular temples
 Raja Thakur Mandir
 Kali Bari, chalk bazar
 Govinda Mandir
 Ram Krishna Ashram
 Gouria Math
 Shiv Bari
 Pagla Bastav, Bijoygaon
 Basugaon Shasan Kali Mandir
 Durga Bari
 Satsang Kendra, Basugaon, Rajacharang
 Basugaon Bhutiapara Shive Mandir, Basugaon

Education

Schools
There are a good number of schools, but those providing secondary education are few.
Renowned among them are:

 Basugaon Higher Secondary School
 Netaji Subhas Vidyanekitan Higher Secondary School, Basugaon (Subhas Nagar)
 Raja Ajit Narayan Dev Girls' High School, Goglapara, Basugaon
 St. Xaviers Residential School, Nichinapara, Basugaon
 St. Francis Convent High School, Hekaipara, Basugaon
 Vivekananda Budsland Academy, Basugaon
 Bijoygaon High School, Bijoygaon, Basugaon
 Ganpith Jatia Vidyalaya, Basugaon
 Geolang High School, Ranchaidham, Basugaon
 JNV, Kokrajhar
 Gurukul National Senior Secondary School, Basugaon
 Kidzee
 Basugaon J.B. School
 Rajacharang LP School

Colleges
 Basugaon College
 Acharya Junior College
 Basugaon Junior College
 Gurukl National Senior Secondary School, Basugaon

Transport

Rail
Basugaon falls under the Northeast Frontier Railway zone of the Indian Railways. There are two stations in Chirang District – Basugaon and Bijni. Basugaon Station is the nearest station for New Bongaigaon Jn. is considered to be the Adarsh Station of India (a railway flyover is under construction).

Roadways
National Highway 31 connects Basugaon with the states Bihar, Jharkhand and West Bengal. National Highway 37 from Goalpara in Assam to Dimapur in Nagaland traverses the entire length of Assam and connects Basugaon with almost all the major cities of Assam including the cities of Jorhat and Dibrugarh. National Highway 31C connects Basugaon to Guwahati and National Highway 37 also connects Basugaon with Guwahati.
 Basugaon-Kashikotra Road (Towards NH-)
 Basugaon-Kokrajhar Road (via Salakati)
 Basugaon-Bongaigaon Road (via Dangtol)
 Basugaon-Talguri Road (Towards NH-)

Demographics

Localities in Basugaon 

 Subhash nagar 
 Chok Bazar
 Gogla para
 BHUTIAPARA
 Ram Krishna Ashram Road
 Garu bazar
 Nichinapara
 Nehalgaon
 sishumagal
 Ranchaidam
 Bijoygaon
 Basugaon main road
 Basugaon Champa
 Basuagon RAILWAY STATION ROAD
 Basugaon town committee road
 Basugaon college road
 Vivekananda pally
 Basugaon College Road
 Basugaon Chariali
 Rajacharang

References

Cities and towns in Chirang district